Lutibacterium is a genus of Gram-negative staining bacteria. It includes the hydrocarbon-degrading strain Lutibacterium anuloederans LC8.

References

Hydrocarbon-degrading bacteria
Bacteria genera